Logistic Air is an airline that offers short and long-term aircraft leasing, including wet and dry leases.

Fleet 

Logistic Air's current fleet includes:

Boeing 747 Passenger 
Boeing 747 Freighter
Boeing 737-400
Boeing 737-500
Boeing 737-200QC  
Boeing 727-200 Freighter
McDonnell Douglas DC-10-30F
McDonnell Douglas DC-9-32F
McDonnell Douglas MD-82

External links 
 Logistic Air

References

Aircraft leasing companies
Airlines based in Nevada